Charles Hooks (February 20, 1768 – October 18, 1843) was a United States Representative from North Carolina; born in Bertie County, North Carolina, February 20, 1768; when he was two years old his parents moved to Duplin County, North Carolina and settled on a plantation near Kenansville; became a planter; member of the State house of commons 1801–1805; served in the State senate in 1810 and 1811; elected as a Democratic-Republican to the Fourteenth Congress to fill the vacancy caused by the resignation of William R. King and served from December 2, 1816 to March 4, 1817; elected to the Sixteenth, Seventeenth, and Eighteenth Congresses (March 4, 1819 – March 4, 1825); moved to Alabama in 1826, settled near Montgomery, and again engaged in planting; died near Montgomery, Ala., October 18, 1843; interment in the Molton family cemetery.  Hooks was the great-grandfather of William Julius Harris.

See also 
 Fourteenth United States Congress
 Sixteenth United States Congress
 Seventeenth United States Congress
 Eighteenth United States Congress

External links
 U.S. Congress Biographical Directory entry

People from Bertie County, North Carolina
1768 births
1843 deaths
American planters
Democratic-Republican Party members of the United States House of Representatives from North Carolina
People from Kenansville, North Carolina
19th-century American politicians